The Cumberland Football Association, is the governing body of football in the ancient county of Cumberland, England and was founded in 1884. The Cumberland FA run a number of cups at different levels for teams all across North Cumbria. South Cumbria is covered by the Lancashire FA. The head office used to be based in Workington but in April 2018, they moved into a new office located in Cockermouth.

Teams & Leagues covered by the Cumberland FA
Carlisle United
Workington
Penrith
Whitehaven
Cleator Moor Celtic
Carlisle City
Windscale
Cumberland County League
Westmorland League

(Senior & Saturday teams listed only)

County Cups Winners 2017/18

External links
 Cumberland FA's official website

County football associations
Football in Cumbria